7 Days News is a private weekly newspaper published in Burma. it was one of the best selling journals in Myanmar. It was suspended for one week for publishing front-page news on Aung San Suu Kyi in November 2010. Other publications also suspended were The Voice Weekly, Venus News, Pyithu Khit, Myanmar Post, The Snap Shot and Myanmar Newsweek. Thaung Su Nyein, the CEO of 7 Days News Journal, is son of Win Aung, Ex-minister of Foreign Affair of Myanmar Government.

References

External links

Planet's News

See also
List of newspapers in Burma

Weekly newspapers published in Myanmar
Mass media in Myanmar
Burmese news websites